Bethesda was an unincorporated community and census-designated place (CDP) in western Independence County, Arkansas, United States. It was first listed as a CDP in the 2020 census with a population of 199.

It is connected to the Arkansas Highway System via Highway 106S and is approximately eight miles west of Batesville.

Demographics

2020 census

Note: the US Census treats Hispanic/Latino as an ethnic category. This table excludes Latinos from the racial categories and assigns them to a separate category. Hispanics/Latinos can be of any race.

References

Unincorporated communities in Independence County, Arkansas
Unincorporated communities in Arkansas
Census-designated places in Independence County, Arkansas